Philip John Rochow (26 February 1937 – 26 December 2013) was an Australian rules footballer who played with Fitzroy in the Victorian Football League (VFL). 	

Phil's brother Keith Rochow also played football for Fitzroy during the 1957 VFL season.

See also
 Australian football at the 1956 Summer Olympics

Notes

External links 

		
1937 births		
Australian rules footballers from Victoria (Australia)
Fitzroy Football Club players
2013 deaths